Deoli is a census town in the South district of the state of Delhi, India.

Demographics
 India census, Deoli had a population of 119,432. Males constitute 56% of the population and females 44%. Deoli has an average literacy rate of 64%, higher than the national average of 59.5%: male literacy is 73% and, female literacy is 54%. In Deoli, 19% of the population is under 6 years of age.

References

Cities and towns in South Delhi district